Marion Mathie  (6 February 1925 – 20 January 2012) was an English actress who appeared in the last four series of Rumpole of the Bailey as his fearsome wife, Hilda ("She Who Must Be Obeyed") and many other roles in other productions, including Mrs Susan Wyse in the London Weekend Television adaptation of the Mapp and Lucia books by E. F. Benson.

Filmography

Notes

External links
Obituary, The Stage

1925 births
2012 deaths
English television actresses
People from Kingston upon Thames